Máirtín Ó Direáin (29 November 1910 – 19 March 1988) was an Irish poet from the Aran Islands Gaeltacht. Along with Seán Ó Ríordáin and Máire Mhac an tSaoi, Ó Direáin was, in the words of Louis de Paor, "one of a trinity of poets who revolutionised Irish language poetry in the 1940s and 50s."

Biography
Ó Direáin was born in Sruthán on Inis Mór in the Aran Islands and was educated at Onaght national school. The son of a small farmer, Máirtín Ó Direáin grew up as a monoglot and spoke only Connacht Irish until his mid-teens. Like many other Irish poets and writers of the post-Independence era, Ó Direáin worked in the Irish civil service from 1928 until 1975. In 1952, he translated a play by Irish playwright Teresa Deevy for Radio Eireann; the play was called The King of Spain's Daughter (translated as Iníon Rí na Spáinne).

His literary awards include the An Chomhairle Ealaíon/The Arts Council Awards (1964 and 1971); the Butler Prize, with Eoghan Ó Tuairisc (1967); the Ossian Prize for Poetry, FVS Foundation, Hamburg (1977). He was a member of Aosdána.

While Ó Direáin was rooted deeply in the Gaelic tradition, his poetry also shows influence from wider European writers. His influences included Nietzsche, Spengler, Yeats, Haicéad, Ó Bruadair, Bedell and Shakespeare.

Legacy
Carraig agus cathair: Ó Direáin is a recent (2002) biography.  Its title ('Rock and City') refers to Ó Direáin's journey from his native rocky island to Dublin, where he lived most of his life.

An Charraig Stoite (The Uprooted Rock) is a 2003 award-nominated TG4/Bord Scannán na hÉireann funded documentary on Máirtín Ó Direáin which was written by Alan Titley and produced and directed by Mac Dara Ó Curraidhín.

On 27 May 2010, An Post (the Republic of Ireland's Post Office) issued a single stamp to commemorate the birth centenary of Máirtín Ó Direáin featuring a portrait of the poet.

Legacy in Irish traditional music
Six of Ó Direáin's poems have been put to music by Irish traditional musician  Colm Ó Snodaigh of the music group Kíla: Faoiseamh a Gheobhadsa, Maith Dhom, Bua na Mara, Dínit an Bhróin, "An tEarrach Thiar" and Bí i do Chrann. The first three were recorded on Handel's Fantasy, Luna Park (two Kíla albums) and Giving - Colm Ó Snodaigh's 2007 solo album.

Another more recent musical setting of Faoiseamh a Gheobhadsa was composed by Zoë Conway and her husband John McIntyre, who first recorded their arrangement as part of the album Allt, which is a collaboration with Scottish traditional musician Julie Fowlis and her husband Éamonn Doorley. Conway and McIntyre's musical setting of Ó Direáin's poem remains a very popular one, and they often perform it together on the concert stage. Despite being a native speaker of the North Uist dialect of Scottish Gaelic, Julie Fowlis has performed the song alongside them and has alternated with Zoë Conway in singing the verses in Connacht Irish.

Bibliography
His main works include the poetry collections:
Coinnle Geala (1942)
Dánta Aniar (1943)
Rogha Dánta (1949)
Ó Mórna agus Dánta Eile (1957)
Ár Ré Dhearóil (1962)
Cloch Choirnéil (1967)
Crainn is Cairde (1970)
Dánta 1939-79 (1980)
Ceacht an Éin (1984)
Béasa an Túir (1984)
Tacar Dánta/Selected Poems (1984)
Craobhóg: Dán (1986)
Fear Lásta Lampaí (1928 -  i nGaillimh/in Galway)
His autobiographical essays are collected as Feamainn Bhealtaine (1961).
 Iníon Rí na Spáinne (1952) Translation

References

Bibliography

External links
 Ó Direáin, Máirtín (1910-1988) at ainm.ie
 Short Aosdána biography
 Brief biographical material and sample poem
 Máirtín O'Direáin at The Teresa Deevy Archive
 Máirtín O'Direáin Irish poem  An tEarrach Thiar Irish poem with English translation

1910 births
1988 deaths
20th-century Irish-language poets
20th-century Irish poets
20th-century male writers
Aran Islands
Burials at Mount Jerome Cemetery and Crematorium
Irish male poets
Irish modernist poets
People from County Galway